Fort Good Hope Airport  is located  southwest of Fort Good Hope, Northwest Territories, Canada.

Facilities

A small terminal building with waiting area is the largest structure. There are no storage hangers at the airport. 

Airport runway is gravel, so it handles mainly turboprops (small utility aircraft up to turboprop regional airliner), STOL and other aircraft capable of landing on unpaved or snow covered surfaces.

Airlines and destinations

The airport connects with a few communities within NWT. Destinations beyond requires connecting flights from Inuvik Airport as there is no direct passenger service to and from Yellowknife Airport.

Cargo

References

External links

Certified airports in the Sahtu Region